Lower Tregantle is a hamlet in Cornwall, England, UK. It is about half a mile south of Antony; Higher Tregantle is about a quarter of a mile further south. It should be distinguished from Lower Tregantle, a farm near Luxulyan.

Higher Tregantle Farmhouse is a grade II listed building  with part of the house dating back to the 17th century.

See also

Tregantle Fort

References

Hamlets in Cornwall